Diego Camacho Quesada (born 3 October 1976) is a Spanish former footballer who played as a defensive midfielder.

A late bloomer – he was still playing lower league football at almost 26 – he represented 12 clubs in his career. Over six seasons, he amassed La Liga totals of 154 matches and four goals, mainly with Levante and Sporting de Gijón (two years apiece).

Club career
Born in Madrid, Camacho spent the early part of his career with modest clubs in the third division. For the 2002–03 season, however, he signed with La Liga side Recreativo de Huelva, from Granada CF; he made his debut in the competition on 14 September 2002 in a 0–3 away loss against Valencia CF, as Recre were finally relegated.

In 2004, Camacho joined newly promoted Levante UD and, after experiencing one top-flight promotion and relegation with them, he was loaned to another recently promoted team, Real Valladolid, for 2007–08. After appearing scarcely during the campaign he proceeded to move to Sporting de Gijón (also promoted to the top level), in a 1+1 years deal.

On 23 May 2009, in one of his 31 league appearances, defensive-minded Camacho scored a rare but crucial goal in a 2–1 win at former side Valladolid, as the Asturias team eventually avoided relegation. He featured slightly less in the following season with Sporting finishing in 15th position, again good enough to prevent a drop, and was released at the age of 33.

References

External links

1976 births
Living people
Footballers from Madrid
Spanish footballers
Association football midfielders
La Liga players
Segunda División players
Segunda División B players
Tercera División players
CD Móstoles footballers
CP Mérida footballers
Burgos CF footballers
Gimnàstic de Tarragona footballers
CD Lugo players
Real Murcia players
Gimnástica de Torrelavega footballers
Granada CF footballers
Recreativo de Huelva players
Levante UD footballers
Real Valladolid players
Sporting de Gijón players
Albacete Balompié players